The 31st Golden Bell Awards was held on 25 March 1996 at the Sun Yat-sen Memorial Hall in Taipei, Taiwan. The ceremony was broadcast by TTV.

Winners

References

1996
1996 in Taiwan